, also known as FTV, is a television network headquartered in Fukushima Prefecture, Japan. 

Fukushima Television is the first commercial television broadcaster in Fukushima Prefecture, it was founded in 1962, and started broadcasting in 1963.  In 2023, Fukushima Television celebrated its 60th anniversary.  

On June 1 2006, FTV started broadcasting digital terrestrial television.  Due to the 2011 Tōhoku earthquake and tsunami, FTV postpone its schedule to end analogue television broadcasting on March 31 2012.  

FTV is affiliated with FNN and FNS.  The government of Fukushima prefecture hold half stock share of FTV.  In 2020, FTV moved into its new headquarter.

References

External links
 Official website 

Companies based in Fukushima Prefecture
Television stations in Japan
Fuji News Network
Television channels and stations established in 1962